Duke Cheng may refer to these rulers from ancient China:

Duke Cheng of Qi (died 795 BC)
Duke Cheng of Qin (died 660 BC)
Duke Cheng of Jin (died 600 BC)
Duke Cheng of Lu (died 573 BC)

See also
King Cheng (disambiguation)
Marquis Cheng (disambiguation)